Rob Balachandran (18 November 1974) is an American businessman and rugby league football coach and former player for the New York Knights in the American National Rugby League (AMNRL). His position was wing and center. He is a former USA international.

In 2006, Balachandran was named by Crain's New York Business as a "rising star" in New York's business community. He directed the development of the Hudson River Park while working in Governor George Pataki's administration.

Balachandran was educated at State University of New York at Albany.

External links

References

1974 births
Living people
American rugby league players
New York Knights coaches
New York Knights players
United States national rugby league team coaches
United States national rugby league team players
Place of birth missing (living people)